The Shorelines Casino Thousand Islands, formerly known as the OLG Casino Thousand Islands, the Thousand Islands Charity Casino and the Thousand Islands Casino, is a small casino located in Gananoque, Ontario. It is owned by the Great Canadian Gaming Corporation.

The casino was announced in 2000, and opened in June 2002.  In 2016, Great Canadian took over operation of the casino.

See also
 List of casinos in Canada

External links
Shorleines Thousand Islands Casino
Tourist site

References

Casinos in Ontario
Thousand Islands
Casinos completed in 2002